"The Chosen Ones" is a song by Australian blues and rock band The Black Sorrows. It was released as the second single from their fifth studio album Hold On to Me. The song peaked at number 65 in Australia and number 32 in New Zealand in October 1988.

Track listing
7" single (CBS 653044 7)
 "The Chosen Ones" – 4:06
 "Mercenary Heart" – 3:08

Charts

References

1988 singles
Songs written by Joe Camilleri
Song recordings produced by Joe Camilleri
CBS Records singles
The Black Sorrows songs